Waskhaqucha (Quechua waskha (also waska) rope, qucha lake, hispanicized spelling Huascacocha) or Wask'aqucha (Quechua wask'a rectangle) is a lake in Peru located in the Junín Region, Tarma Province, Huasahuasi District. Waskhaqucha lies east of the lake Chinchayqucha between the village Yaniq of the San Pedro de Cajas District in the north west and the small place San Antonio in the south-east.

References 

Lakes of Peru
Lakes of Junín Region